Torn is a 2013 drama film directed by Jeremiah Birnbaum and written by Michael Richter and starring Mahnoor Baloch, Faran Tahir, Dendrie Taylor and John Heard. The film was released on October 18, 2013.

Premise 
The film is the story of two mothers Maryam (Mahnoor Baloch) and Lea (Dendrie Taylor) who are grieving over their dead teenage sons and then begin to wonder if the other's son wasn't responsible for their child's death.

Cast 
 Mahnoor Baloch
 Faran Tahir
 Dendrie Taylor
 John Heard

Production

Casting 
In September 2012, different news announced the role of Pakistani actress Mahnoor Baloch, she'll debut in Hollywood film Torn by playing the role of a mother.

Release 
First trailer and poster was released on September 3, 2013. Later a new trailer was released.

The film was initially limited released on October 18, 2013 at Village East Cinema in New York City.

References

External links 
 

2013 films
2010s science fiction drama films
American disaster films
American science fiction drama films
Films about terrorism
Films set in 2013
Films set in New York City
Films shot in New York City
American post-apocalyptic films
2013 drama films
Torn
2010s English-language films
2010s American films